Lefty is the seventh solo studio album by Art Garfunkel, released in 1988. The album features three songs by singer-songwriter Stephen Bishop. The album's cover photo shows a pre-teen Art Garfunkel holding a baseball bat in the front yard of his childhood home in the Forest Hills section of Queens, New York City. It was taken by his brother Jules. The album title came from the fact that Garfunkel is left-handed, which the picture established.

The album failed to make the Top 100 in the US (charting at 134) and hit the bottom half of the UK Top 100. Despite this, it yielded three minor hit singles.

The liner notes of the album contain a brief prose text Garfunkel had written in memory of his partner Laurie Bird who had committed suicide in 1979. The album marked a new beginning in Garfunkel's professional life after becoming somewhat of a recluse following the tragedy.

Track listing
 "This Is the Moment" (David Foster, Cynthia Weil, Linda Jenner, Ray Parker Jr.) – 4:31
 "I Have a Love" (Stephen Sondheim, Leonard Bernstein) – 4:28
 "So Much in Love" (George Williams, Bill Jackson, Roy Straigis) – 2:24
 "Slow Breakup" (Stephen Bishop) – 3:46
 "Love Is the Only Chain" (Mary Ann Kennedy, Pam Rose, Pat Bunch) – 4:07
 "When a Man Loves a Woman" (Calvin Lewis, Andrew Wright) – 4:30
 "I Wonder Why" (Bill Lovelady, Marita Phillips, Peter Skellern) – 3:22
 "King of Tonga" (Bishop) – 3:27
 "If Love Takes You Away" (Bishop) – 3:47
 "The Promise" (Nick Holmes) – 3:57

Personnel
Musicians
 Art Garfunkel – vocals
 Steve Gadd – drums
 Joe Osborn – bass guitar
 Nicky Hopkins – keyboards
 Hugh McCracken – guitar
 Del Newman – strings, brass, woodwind
 Robert Sabino – synthesizer
 Stephen Bishop – omnichord, backing vocals
 Eddie Gómez – acoustic bass
 Jeremy Steig – flute
 Michael Brecker – saxophone
 Leah Kunkel – backing vocals
 Kenny Rankin – backing vocals
 Pam Rose – backing vocals
 Mary Ann Kennedy – backing vocals
 Robbie Buchanan – synthesizer (1, 3)
 David Foster – synthesizer (1, 3)
 Jay Graydon – synthesizer (1, 3), guitar (1, 3)
 Gary Chang – synclavier (1, 3)
 Steve Lukather – guitar (1, 3)
 Clif Magness - backing vocals (1, 3)
 Jon Joyce - backing vocals (1, 3)
 Jim Haas - backing vocals (1, 3)

Production
 Geoff Emerick – producer (2, 4-7, 9, 10), engineer (2, 4-10)
 Art Garfunkel – producer (2, 4-7, 9, 10)
 Jay Graydon – producer (1, 3), engineer (1, 3)
 Steve Gadd – producer (8)
 Stuart Breed – engineer (2, 4-10)
 Ian Eales – engineer (1, 3)
 Mick Guzauski – engineer (1, 3)
 Doug Sax – mastering
 Ron Lewter – mastering
 Chris Austropchuk – cover design
 Jules Garfunkel – photography (front cover)
 Caroline Greyshock – photography (back cover)

References

External links
 Official website

1988 albums
Art Garfunkel albums
Columbia Records albums
Albums produced by Geoff Emerick
Albums produced by Art Garfunkel
Albums produced by Richard Perry